Vienna is a city in and the county seat of Johnson County, Illinois, United States, and it is the site of two well-known state penitentiaries. The population of Vienna was 1,434 at the 2010 census.

History

Vienna was originally an Indian trading post in the early 1800s, the forming of Vienna far preceded the rise of the railroad and coal industries in the region. Platted as early as 1818 - the same year Illinois became a state - and named the county seat, Vienna was incorporated as a village in 1837 and then as a city in 1893. It has served as the county seat for close to 200 years. In fact, the first post office opened in 1821 before the town was ever incorporated. Vienna is also one of the settlements tens of thousands of Native Americans were forced to pass through in 1830 en route to Oklahoma where they were relocated by the U.S. government. That forced migration westward came to be known as the Trail of Tears due to the brutal conditions that the Native Americans faced. Having to walk barefoot in the middle of winter, thousands died by order of the U.S. government. The Johnson County Courthouse was built in 1868 and is one of the oldest active courthouses in the state. Total cost of the project 140 years ago was a little more than $80,000 (approximately $1.5 million in 2021).

Notable locations

Vienna Correctional Center—6695 State Route 146 E., Vienna, IL 62995—was opened in November 1965. Vienna is a minimum-security prison. The operational capacity is 1,963. This is an adult male facility only. The Average Annual Cost Per Inmate is $21,310 (FY16).

Heron Pond - Little Black Slough Nature Preserve, a National Natural Landmark, is nearby.

The Tunnel Hill State Trail trail-head and headquarters is located in Vienna.

The Trail of Tears halfway point commemorative totem and flags are located in the adjacent city park.

Vienna is home to the Johnson County Courthouse and the Vienna Public Library, which are on the National Register of Historic Places.

Dixon Springs State Park is located nearby in Dixon Springs, which is about 15 minutes from downtown Vienna.

The Garden of the Gods Wilderness is located a short distance east of Vienna, offering hikers a place to hike locally.

Education
The city, which has about 700 students within its two districts, is home to Vienna Grade School and Vienna High School. Located nearby are Shawnee Community College in Ullin and Southern Illinois University Carbondale in Carbondale, which both act as a local college for students of the geographical area.

Transportation
Although Vienna is not served by an airport or train station, bus service runs through the city twice daily.
Greyhound Bus service to Vienna runs daily to the local Hospitality House and Greyhound Bus Station downtown.

Major highways
 I-24
 US 45
 Illinois Route 146 crosses at the major intersection downtown with U.S. 45.
 Illinois Route 147
 Illinois Route 37
 Illinois Route 145

Bicycling
Vienna is considered by some to be the bicycling capital of the Midwestern USA. Most people who live in the area bicycle weekly on the many trails and bike routes within the city. A bike path that runs from Vienna High School to Vienna Trail of Tears City Park was completed in August 2014, and allows visitors to commute between Northern Vienna and the Tunnel Hill State Trail.

U.S. Bicycle Route 76 crosses with Tunnel Hill State Trail in Vienna.

Tunnel Hill State Trail's Headquarters is in Vienna, and an entire facility equipped with restrooms and vending machines is located within the headquarters, as well as a bicycling museum.

Geography
Vienna is located at  (37.416103, -88.894268).

Demographics

As of the census of 2000, there were 1,234 people, 560 households, and 309 families residing in the city. The racial makeup of the city was 97.89% White, 0.08% African American, 0.08% Asian, 0.81% from other races, and 1.13% from two or more races. Hispanic or Latino of any race were 1.94% of the population.

There were 560 households, out of which 27.7% had children under the age of 18 living with them, 39.5% were married couples living together, 13.2% had a female householder with no husband present, and 44.8% were non-families. 41.4% of all households were made up of individuals, and 25.5% had someone living alone who was 65 years of age or older.  The average household size was 2.12 and the average family size was 2.89.

In the city, the population was spread out, with 22.6% under the age of 18, 9.0% from 18 to 24, 23.8% from 25 to 44, 18.3% from 45 to 64, and 26.3% who were 65 years of age or older.  The median age was 40 years. For every 100 females, there were 77.0 males.  For every 100 females age 18 and over, there were 70.8 males.

The median income for a household in the city was $21,702, and the median income for a family was $31,250. Males had a median income of $34,583 versus $17,614 for females. The per capita income for the city was $13,662.  About 17.7% of families and 20.0% of the population were below the poverty line, including 27.0% of those under age 18 and 21.4% of those age 65 or over.

Notable people 

Levi Casey, triple jumper
Pleasant T. Chapman, Congressman, born nearby and practiced law here
George W. English, U.S. District Court judge, born nearby, practiced law here, was impeached in 1926
William Heirens, reputed serial-killer, spent 23 years at Vienna Correctional Center
Andrew J. Kuykendall, Congressman, practiced law here
Adrian Lindsey, college football coach
C. L. McCormick, Illinois legislator, lived here
William W. Mitchell, Sr., Arizona legislator, born here
Paul Powell, former Illinois Secretary of State, born here

References

Cities in Johnson County, Illinois
Cities in Illinois
County seats in Illinois
Sundown towns in Illinois